Wilson Anthony "Boozoo" Chavis (pronounced CHAY-viss) (October 23, 1930 – May 5, 2001) was an American accordion player, singer, songwriter and bandleader.  He was one of the pioneers of zydeco, the fusion of Cajun and blues music developed in southwest Louisiana.

Early life
Chavis was born in Church Point, Louisiana to parents Arthur and Marceline Chavis in a Cajun Creole settlement called Pied des Chiens (Dog Hill), and was the son of tenant farmers. He acquired the nickname "Boozoo" in his childhood, although the origin of the nickname is unknown. When asked by a reporter about his nickname, Chavis replied "Man, I hate that question".

Accounts vary as to when and how Chavis obtained his first accordion. A Living Blues magazine story says that at age 9, he traded a small riding horse for his first accordion, a little single-row model, and taught himself to play. An article in OffBeat Magazine claims that Chavis bought his first accordion with money earned from riding in a horse race when he was a teenager. He was exposed to music within his family; his father, some uncles and cousins all played accordion. Chavis credits his mother as being especially enterprising, as she took on cleaning jobs and selling barbeque at informal horse races to raise extra money, with which she bought three acres of land. When he was 14, the Chavis family moved "across the highway".

Later, Chavis bought a button accordion and began performing regularly at a dance club that his mother opened, often sitting in on performances with Clifton Chenier, his father Morris Chenier and brother Cleveland Chenier. Chavis also played music as a side job at house dances on weekends and evenings. As well as developing the playing style that came to be known as zydeco, Chavis worked as a farmer, jockey, and horse trainer.

Career
Chavis made his first recording in 1954, "Paper in My Shoe", based on a song he heard performed by Creole accordionist Ambrose "Potato" Sam. Chavis's version was an uptempo tune with a dance beat about being too poor to afford new shoes or socks, so he placed a paper in his shoes to keep his feet warm when the holes in the sole got too large. The song, sung in both French and English, was originally released on the Folk-Star label, a subsidiary of Goldband, before being reissued by Imperial Records. This recording was the first commercially released zydeco song and the first zydeco hit, and was subsequently acknowledged as a zydeco standard. The song was recorded at the instigation of local entrepreneur Eddie Shuler, who teamed Chavis up with a rhythm and blues band named Classie Ballou's Tempo Kings. The first recording session was not successful, so Shuler brought whiskey in for subsequent takes, and the band lost their inhibitions. An inebriated Chavis fell off of his chair at the end of the released version of "Paper in My Shoe", so the song fades out, which was one of the first records to use that technique.

Chavis was convinced that the recording was more successful than the record companies claimed, later saying: "I got gypped out of my record. I get frustrated, sometimes. I love to play, but, when I get to thinking about 1955... They stole my record. They said that it only sold 150,000 copies. But, my cousin, who used to live in Boston, checked it out. It sold over a million copies. I was supposed to have a gold record." As a result, Chavis lost trust in the music business, and over the next thirty years only released three more singles: "Forty-One Days" (Folk-Star, 1955), "Hamburgers & Popcorn" (Goldband, 1965), and "Mama! Can I Come Home" (credited to the Dog Hill Playhouse Band, Crazy Cajun, 1974).

He performed rarely during the 1960s and 1970s, devoting most of his time to farming and raising racehorses on his property in Dog Hill, on the outskirts of Lake Charles, Louisiana. The area derived its name because it is where people traditionally went to dump unwanted pets. During those years, zydeco's popularity was limited mainly to Louisiana. By the early 1980s however, zydeco was gaining recognition outside of Louisiana in the United States, as well developing as a strong following in Europe, thanks largely to the popularity of artists such as Clifton Chenier, Buckwheat Zydeco, and Rockin' Dopsie. Those artists were performing as main attractions at music festivals, were included in magazine stories, and were getting the attention of major record labels.

In the early 1980s, Chavis was making a meager living with his race horses, and earned only a small amount of money performing at occasional house parties or dances. Chavis's family, and in particular his wife Leona, encouraged him to resume his music career. Chavis returned to performing music regularly in 1984 after discovering that another musician was impersonating him. He and his wife were driving to a horse race and heard an advertisement on the radio for a dance featuring Boozoo Chavis, after which he realized that there was enough name recognition for him to return to performing. He signed a five-year contract with the Maison de Soul label, and released a locally successful single, "Dog Hill" and four albums: Louisiana Zydeco Music (1986), Boozoo Zydeco! (1987), Zydeco Homebrew (1989), and Zydeco Trail Ride (1990). Louisiana Zydeco Music included a re-recording of "Paper In My Shoe" that was included on many jukeboxes in Louisiana and became a regional hit for a second time. In addition, Rounder Records released a live album Zydeco Live! in 1989, and a compilation of his 1950s recordings, The Lake Charles Atomic Bomb, in 1990.  He also recorded two albums for Sonet Records in the early 1990s. During this time period, many of his songs also appeared on compilation albums issued by labels in both the US and Europe that featured many of the most well-known zydeco performers.

Chavis earned the nickname "The Creole Cowboy" because of his background raising horses, as well as his habit of wearing a white Stetson hat during performances. In addition, the subject matter of some of his songs was explicitly rural, such as "Zydeco Hee Haw", "Johnnie Billy Goat", and "Motor Dude Special" named for his prized thoroughbred horse. Chavis also routinely wore an apron while on stage, to keep his sweat from damaging his accordion.

Chavis was a prolific writer of zydeco songs, some including references to his friends and acquaintances and others too raunchy to be sold openly. The release of X-rated versions of his songs "Uncle Bud" and "Deacon Jones" on his 1999 album Who Stole My Monkey? resulted in a parental advisory sticker, the first for a zydeco recording. Many of his songs have become standards of the zydeco repertoire, in spite of, or perhaps because of, their generally idiosyncratic and quirky construction and subject matter.  "If it's wrong, do it wrong, with me," he would tell his band. "If I'm wrong, you wrong, too!"

Until 1990, Chavis was notoriously afraid of flying. He told record producer Floyd Soileau that if Soileau wanted him to fly to performances, he'd have to get him drunk to get on an airplane. Over a prior five-year period, Chavis made just one trip to California, and he drove there from Louisiana. But after Chavis's mother died in May 1990, he decided he had to overcome his flying phobia in order to advance his music career. His first flight was to New York City to perform at a club called Tramps, and he claimed to have enjoyed the experience.

During the 1990s, Chavis performed widely with his band, the Magic Sounds (also credited as the Majic Sounds), and was crowned "The King of Zydeco" in New Orleans in 1993, after Clifton Chenier's death.  His style, using a button rather than piano accordion, was more traditional than that of Chenier.  According to The New York Times, "with his rough-hewn voice and hefty accordion riffs, his band's one-chord grooves had a mesmerizing intensity that kept dance floors packed". He appeared at the New York Jazzfest for ten consecutive years as well as appearances at the Newport Folk Festival and the New Orleans Jazz and Heritage Festival, and in 2000 he was a featured act at the San Francisco Jazz Festival. Chavis was featured in a 1994 documentary film titled The Kingdom of Zydeco.

Death 
Chavis died on May 5, 2001, from complications resulting from a heart attack after a performance a week earlier in Austin, Texas. He was funeralized at Our Lady Queen of Heaven Catholic Church and interred at Highland Memorial Gardens, both in Lake Charles, Louisiana.

Awards and honors
Chavis was inducted into the Zydeco Hall of Fame in 1998. In 2001, he was awarded a National Heritage Fellowship by the National Endowment for the Arts, which is the highest honor in the folk and traditional arts in the United States.

Personal life
Chavis married Leona Predium who often accompanied Chavis on tour, and on breaks between sets would sell records, T-shirts, and panties with his photo printed on them. Leona died in 2009.

Boozoo and Leona had six children (Wilson Jr. ("Poncho"), Margaret ("Do-Right"), Louann, Charles, Licia, and Rellis Chavis), 21 grandchildren, and many great grandchildren. Two of his sons (Charles on washboard and Rellis on drums) were full-time band members, and a grandson occasionally performed with the Magic Sounds.

In 1995, Chavis had the tips of two fingers on his left hand amputated after an accident involving a barbeque pit. With his hand wrapped up in bandage tape, he played a gig the following night.

Legacy
Chavis had completed the recording of what would be his final album only a few weeks before his death. Tentatively titled I'm Still Blinkin'  the album was released on Rounder Records later in 2001 under the title Down Home On Dog Hill. AllMusic wrote of the album: "Chavis may have been at the peak of his musical form when this album was recorded….[It] is a worthy legacy for a sorely missed star of Louisiana music."

After his father's death, his son Charles took on the role of bandleader for the Magic Sounds. However, Charles died of a heart attack at age 45, only eight months after his father's death. Charles is buried in the same Lake Charles cemetery as his father.

Following Charles' death, Poncho Chavis kept the Magic Sounds band going, including a tribute performance to his father at the 2002 New Orleans Jazz and Heritage Festival, just four months after his brother's death and less than a year after his father's passing. Photos of both Boozoo and Charles graced the stage at the Jazz Fest show. Poncho Chavis and the Magic Sounds continued to perform at festivals until at least 2008.

In 2005, five of Boozoo Chavis' grandsons started a band named The Dog Hill Stompers, partly to keep their grandfather's legacy alive. They released their debut album Keeping the Tradition in 2007, and also performed for the first time at Boozoo's Labor Day Festival in 2007. As of 2017, the Dog Hill Stompers continue to play clubs and festivals in Louisiana as well as around the United States.

Chavis founded the "Labor Day Dog Hill Festival" in 1989 as a fan appreciation party, but also to showcase zydeco musicians and to keep the zydeco tradition alive. Originally held in a field near the Chavis family home, the popularity and growth of the festival required a move to larger venues, with the festival location varying between the Knights of Columbus Hall in Iowa, Louisiana and the Lake Charles Civic Center. The event was always a family-friendly affair, with Leona cooking Creole dishes for the crowds, ranging from red beans and rice to crawfish étouffée.

After Boozoo's death, the festival was renamed as Boozoo's Labor Day Festival to celebrate his legacy and love of zydeco music. His widow Leona managed the festival until her death in 2009, after which their children have been determined to continue the tradition in honor of their father, with daughter Margaret acting as festival promoter. In 2015 the Southeast Tourism Society, which has 12 states as members, named Boozoo's Labor Day Festival a "Top 20 Event". The festival celebrated its thirty-second anniversary in 2016.

Other musicians have acknowledged Chavis's influence and legacy by writing songs about him. Rock band NRBQ included a tribute song titled "Boozoo, That's Who" on their 1989 album Wild Weekend, on which both Boozoo and Charles Chavis also performed. In the song, Chavis is described as "the king of zydeco". Younger zydeco musician Jo Jo Reed released a song he wrote titled "Got It From Boo" on his 1995 album Funky Zydeco.

Several zydeco, Cajun, and musicians from other genres appeared on a tribute album titled Boozoo Hoodoo!: The Songs of Boozoo Chavis released in 2003 on the Fuel 2000 record label.

Discography

Studio and live albums

Singles

Various artist compilation albums

Guest appearance credits

References

External links

 
 
 Remembering Boozoo Chavis
 

1930 births
2001 deaths
20th-century African-American male singers
20th-century accordionists
African-American male songwriters
American accordionists
Musicians from Lake Charles, Louisiana
American racehorse trainers
Singers from Louisiana
Zydeco accordionists
Rounder Records artists
Maison de Soul Records artists
National Heritage Fellowship winners
African-American Catholics